The Appalachian Province is a floristic province within the North American Atlantic Region, a floristic region within the Holarctic Kingdom. It was historically covered by deciduous forest. The province includes southern Ontario and Quebec, down to central Georgia and Alabama. It includes most of Arkansas, part of eastern Texas, and stretches west through the Ouachita Mountains, Ozark Plateau, eastern Iowa, and southeastern Minnesota. It is bounded on the north by the Canadian Province, on the east and south by the Atlantic and Gulf Coastal Plain Province, and on the west by the North American Prairies Province.

See also
Appalachian Mountains

References

Floristic provinces
Appalachian forests
Appalachian Mountains
Temperate broadleaf and mixed forests in the United States
Flora of the Appalachian Mountains
Flora of the Eastern United States
Ecoregions of the United States
Holarctic flora